Charles Huron Kaman (June 15, 1919 – January 31, 2011) was an American aeronautical engineer, businessman, inventor, and philanthropist, known for his work in rotary-wing flight and also in musical instrument design via the Kaman Music Corporation.

Biography
Charles Huron Kaman was born in 1919 to Charles William Kaman and Mabel Davis Kaman in Washington, D.C., the son of a construction supervisor. He later attended Catholic University of America, gaining an engineering degree magna cum laude in 1940.

Helicopters
Kaman's first aircraft experience was working for Igor Sikorsky. In 1945, he started his own aircraft company, Kaman Aircraft, to pursue his own designs. In January 1947, the Kaman K-125 helicopter first flew. It utilized intermeshing rotors and Kaman's patented servo-flap rotor control. The Kaman K-225, first flown in 1951, also used intermeshing rotors with servo-flap control and was the world's first helicopter to be powered by a gas turbine.

Business
Kaman was an aficionado of the guitar, and in 1966, he founded Ovation Instruments. The company would become the Ovation Guitar Company and developed an acoustic guitar using aerospace composite materials, featuring a rounded back design. Kaman also founded Kaman Industrial Technologies, one of the largest industrial distributors in North America.  He and his second wife, Roberta, created the Fidelco Guide Dog Foundation, and developed a breed of German Shepherd to act as guide dogs.

Marriage and children
Kaman's first wife was the former Helen Sylvander. They married in 1945 and divorced in 1971. Later in 1971 he remarried, to Roberta Hallock, who died in 2010. He had three children — C. William Kaman, II; Steven W. Kaman; and Mrs. Cathleen Kaman Wood.

Death
Kaman died in Bloomfield, Connecticut, on January 31, 2011, at the age of 91. He had suffered from Alzheimer's disease in his last years.

Awards
Kaman was awarded honorary degrees by the University of Connecticut, the University of Hartford, and the University of Colorado. His other honors included:

 National Inventors Hall of Fame (2003)
 Honorary Fellow of the American Helicopter Society (1950)
 Wright Brothers Memorial Trophy (1997)
 National Medal of Technology (1996)
 Naval Aviation Hall of Honor at the National Naval Aviation Museum (1996)
 Department of Defense Distinguished Public Service Medal (1995)
 Honorary Fellow of the Royal Aeronautical Society (1995)
 Kaman's K-225 helicopter is displayed in the Smithsonian Institution's Vertical Flight exhibition at the Steven F. Udvar-Hazy Center in Chantilly, VA. This design was the first helicopter to fly with a gas turbine-driven transmission.    <Smithsonian Article on Kaman/13>
International Air & Space Hall of Fame inductee (1999)

References

13 < https://airandspace.si.edu/collection-objects/kaman-k-225 (retrieved 7/5/2018)

Sources

External links
 — Rotor Control Mechanism for Aircraft of Rotary Wing Type
  : Obituary of Charles Kaman on the Kaman Corporation web site
Bill Kaman Interview - NAMM Oral History Library (2007)

1919 births
2011 deaths
American aerospace engineers
Aviation inventors
American inventors
National Medal of Technology recipients
People from Bloomfield, Connecticut
People from Washington, D.C.
Catholic University of America alumni
Engineers from Connecticut